Axel Elof Bertil Johansson (7 December 1902 – 4 November 1975) was a Swedish footballer who played for Uddevalla. He featured twice for the Sweden national football team in 1927, scoring two goals.

Career statistics

International

International goals
Scores and results list Sweden's goal tally first.

References

1902 births
1975 deaths
Footballers from Gothenburg
Swedish footballers
Sweden international footballers
Association football forwards